Tawella; is a small town in Halabja Governorate, Kurdistan Region, Iraq about 34 km east of Halabja. It is the home of the Sheikhs of Tavil.

References

External links
 Sarkashnaeb(Kurdish)
 Iraq-iran-borderline-mountains-tawela

Cities in Iraqi Kurdistan
Hawraman
Halabja Governorate
Populated places in Halabja Governorate